Vanilla Sky is a 2001 film starring Tom Cruise and directed by Cameron Crowe.

Vanilla Sky may also refer to:

 "Vanilla Sky" (song), by Paul McCartney, 2001
 Vanilla Sky, a 2019 EP by Bladee 
 Vanilla Sky (band), an Italian pop punk band
 Vanilla Sky (airline), a Georgian airline also known as Service Air or AK-Air Georgia

See also
 Music from Vanilla Sky, a soundtrack album from the film